The 2008–09 season was the 97th season in the history of CD Tenerife and the club's seventh consecutive season in the second division of Spanish football. In addition to the domestic league, Tenerife participated in this season's edition of the Copa del Rey. The season covered the period from 1 July 2008 to 30 June 2009.

Players

Competitions

Overall record

Segunda División

League table

Results summary

Results by round

Matches

Copa del Rey

References

CD Tenerife seasons
Tenerife